Blush is a medium bright tone of pink. 

The first written use of blush as a color name in English was in 1590.

Use
The color blush represents live theatre because it is a color often used for theatre makeup.

Tones of blush color comparison chart

See also
List of colors (compact)

References

Shades of red